Disobey is the debut studio album by the American heavy metal band Bad Wolves. The album peaked at number 23 on the US Billboard 200 chart.

The first single, "Toast to the Ghost", was released on November 2, 2017. They are also known for "Zombie", a cover of the 1994 song originally performed by The Cranberries, which was released on January 18, 2018 as the second single. The third single, "Hear Me Now", was released on April 20, 2018. The fourth and final single, "Remember When" was released on June 21, 2018.

Music videos have also been released for "Learn to Live" and "No Masters".

Promotion
On April 17, 2018, the band announced a co-headlining U.S. tour with From Ashes to New in June, beginning at The Annex in Madison, Wisconsin and finishing in Oklahoma City's Diamond Ballroom. On August 14, they were announced on select October shows as a supporting act on Three Days Grace's fall European tour supporting their sixth album Outsider, starting at Portsmouth's Pyramids Centre and concluding in Warsaw's Progresja. On October 2, lead singer Tommy Vext was hospitalized during a show in Nottingham after suffering from "a severe viral bronchial infection" that he further explained on his Instagram page. Vext reached out to fellow Eleven Seven label mates As Lions and Bang Bang Romeo to take his band's place on the tour while he recovered.

Critical reception

Jay H. Gorania of Blabbermouth.net praised the band's musicianship for creating various sounds that aren't retreads of their former respective acts, giving note of their use of simplistic musical conventions to create an approachable yet hard-hitting record, concluding that, "[T]here has been a massive void on the contemporary side of heavy music in recent times. Bad Wolves is poised to move in for the kill." Nicholas Senior of New Noise Magazine said that despite the album's lengthy runtime, he lauded the band for crafting melodic groove metal tracks that don't dilute their sound to be accessible for mainstream rock radio, concluding that "Disobey, despite some startlingly political lyrics, have the hooks and riffs that should appeal to rock and metal fans aplenty."

Chart performance
Disobey debuted and peaked at number 23 on the Billboard 200 the week of May 26, 2018, before dropping sixty-eight spots to number 91 the week of June 2 and leaving the next week. The album debuted at number 9 in Australia before dropping to number 35 the next week and leaving the chart completely. It did not fare as well in Switzerland, Austria and the UK, entering at numbers 24, 39 and 51 for one week.

Track listing

Note
The acoustic version of "Truth or Dare" is available only to members of the band's Patreon page.

Personnel
Adapted credits from the liner notes of Disobey.

Bad Wolves
 Tommy Vext – lead vocals
 Doc Coyle – lead guitar, backing vocals
 Chris Cain – rhythm guitar
 Kyle Konkiel – bass guitar, backing vocals
 John Boecklin – drums

Additional musicians
 DIAMANTE – guest vocals on "Hear Me Now"
 Philip Naslund – additional instrumentation 
 Max Karon – additional guitars

Production
 Kane Churko – mixing, mastering 
 Joseph McQueen – mixing , vocal engineering and mixing
 Kristoffer Folin – additional vocal recording
 Mark Lewis – drum engineering and producing
 Matt Brown – drum technician
 James Thatcher – drum technician
 John Douglas – mix assisting

Artwork
 Zoltan Bathory – cover art
 Trevor Niemann – package design
 Stephen Steelman – photography

Charts

Weekly charts

Year-end charts

References

 

2018 debut albums
Eleven Seven Label Group albums
Bad Wolves albums